The LA engines are a family of pushrod OHV small block 90° V-configured gasoline engines built by Chrysler Corporation. It was factory-installed in passenger vehicles, trucks and vans, commercial vehicles, marine and industrial applications from 1964 through 1991 (318) & 1992 (360). The combustion chambers are wedge-shaped, rather than the polyspherical combustion chambers in the predecessor A engine or the hemispherical combustion chambers in the Chrysler Hemi engine. LA engines have the same  bore spacing as the A engines. LA engines were made at Chrysler's Mound Road Engine plant in Detroit, Michigan, as well as plants in Canada and Mexico. The "LA" stands for "Light A", as the 1956 - 1967 "A" engine it was closely based on and shares many parts with was nearly 50 pounds heavier. The "LA" and "A" production overlapped from 1964 - 1966 in the US and through 1967 in export vehicles when the "A" 318 engine was phased out.  Willem Weertman, who later became Chief Engineer – Engine Design and Development, was in charge of the conversion. The basic design of the LA engine would go unchanged through the development of the "Magnum" upgrade (1992-1993) and into the 2000s with changes to enhance power and efficiency.

239 V6

The  V6 was released in 1987 for use in the Dodge Dakota and as a replacement for the older, longer Slant-Six for the Dodge RAM. It is essentially a six-cylinder version of the 318 V8. The bore and stroke are 99.3 mm (3.9 in) and 84 mm (3.3 in), respectively. In 1987 it used a two-barrel Holley carburetor and hydraulic tappets. In 1988 it was upgraded with throttle-body fuel injection and roller tappets which it retained until the 1992 Magnum update. Next, in the 1992 Magnum update, the throttle-body fuel injection was upgraded to a multi-port fuel injection. In 1997, it was then upgraded to sequential fuel injection. The engine was produced through 2004 before it was replaced with the 3.7 L Power Tech V6.

 1987–1991 Dodge Dakota
 1992–2004 Dodge Dakota Magnum
 1988–1991 Dodge Ram
 1992–2001 Dodge Ram Magnum
 1988–1991 Dodge Ram Van
 1992–2003 Dodge Ram Van Magnum

273 V8

It had a mechanical solid lifter valvetrain until 1968 when hydraulic lifters were introduced; hydraulic lifters generally make for a quieter valvetrain. The reciprocating assembly included a cast or forged steel crankshaft, drop forged steel connecting rods and cast aluminum pistons. The valvetrain consisted of a cast nodular iron camshaft, solid or hydraulic lifters, solid pushrods and shaft-mounted, malleable iron rocker arms (stamped steel on later hydraulic-cam engines). These actuated the overhead steel intake and exhaust valves. The cylinder heads featured wedge-shaped combustion chambers with a single intake and a single exhaust valve for each cylinder. Spark plugs were located in the side of the cylinder head, between the exhaust ports.

A high performance  was offered 1965-'67, this was standard in the Barracuda Formula S model and optional in all other compact models excluding station wagons. It featured a 4-bbl. carburetor and matching intake manifold, chrome unsilenced air cleaner with callout sticker, longer-duration and higher-lift camshaft and stronger valve springs, 10.5:1 compression ratio, special black wrinkle valve covers with extruded aluminum appliques, and a low-restriction exhaust system with a  exhaust pipe, collector-type Y-junction, and exposed resonator. In 1965 (only) the muffler was of "straight through" construction.

A special version was also available in 1966 only - it used a  lift solid-lifter camshaft, fabricated-steel-tube exhaust, and a Holley 4-barrel carburetor, producing  (1 hp/cu in). It was available in the Dodge Dart only, and the car so equipped was called the "D-Dart", a reference to its classification in NHRA D-stock for drag racing, which was the car's only intended purpose.

 1964–1969 Dodge Dart
 1964–1969 Plymouth Barracuda
 Plymouth Belvedere
 Dodge Coronet
 Plymouth Satellite
 1964–1969 Plymouth Valiant
 1966–1967 Ghia 450 SS

318 V8

Like all LA engines, the LA 318 was a  relative of the A 318. Like the A 318, it has a bore & stroke of  X . It appeared in volume production beginning with the 1968 model year, replacing the last of the export "A" 318 engines equipped with polyspherical chambered heads ("A" 318 engines were not offered in 1967 domestic vehicles). The LA engine was available until 1991 when it was superseded by the Magnum version (See below). It used hydraulic lifters and a two barrel carburetor for most of its production, though four-barrel Carter Thermo-Quad and Rochester Quadrajet carburetors were used in police applications starting in 1978 and 1985, respectively. The 318 2bbl ELD received roller lifters and a fast-burn chambered cylinder head in 1985 (The Police ELE 318 4bbl continued to use modified J heads and hydraulic flat tappets through 1989).
Throttle-body electronic fuel injection was factory equipment on the 1981-1983 Imperial. From 1988 to 1991, another throttle-body fuel injection system was used for truck and van applications.

 1983–1989 Chrysler Fifth Avenue
 1981–1983 Chrysler Imperial (fuel injection)
 1968–1981 Chrysler Valiant
 1977–1981 Chrysler LeBaron
 1979-1982 Chrysler New Yorker
 1981–1983 Chrysler Imperial
 1975–1983 Chrysler Cordoba
 1976–1980 Dodge Aspen
 Dodge Charger
 Dodge Challenger
 Dodge Coronet
 1968–1976 Dodge Dart
 1977–1989 Dodge Diplomat
 1991-1992 Dodge Dakota
 1971–1972 Dodge Demon
 1973–1976 Dodge Dart Sport
1970-1980 (Valiant) Dodge Super Bee (Mexico)
 1971–1979 Dodge GTX (Argentina)
 1978-1979 Dodge Magnum
 1980–1983 Dodge Mirada
 1967–1992 Dodge Ram
 Dodge Ram Van
 1974-1992 Dodge Ramcharger
 1968–1974 Plymouth Barracuda
 Plymouth Belvedere
 1970–1976 Plymouth Duster
 1967-1972 Plymouth Fury
 1972–1989 Plymouth Gran Fury
 1964-1974 Plymouth Satellite
 1974-1981 Plymouth Trail Duster
 1968–1976 Plymouth Valiant
 1976–1980 Plymouth Volaré
 1981-19?? Allard J2X2
 1976-1979 Monteverdi Safari
 1977-1980 Monteverdi Sierra
 Volkswagen 11-160/22-160 (Ethanol-powered VW Truck)
 Dodge E-13 (Ethanol-powered Truck)
 Companhia Brasileira de Tratores (CBT) 3000 and 3500 (Ethanol powered tractor)

340 V8

In the mid-1960s, Chrysler decided to adapt the  small block V8 into a lightweight, high output engine equally suited for drag strip or street performance use. Its block was bored out to  but  stroke left unchanged, resulting in the  engine introduced for the 1968 model year. Anticipating higher loads resulting from racing operation, the engineers fitted a forged shot peened steel crankshaft instead of the cast nodular iron unit used in the 318. This also included shot peened hammer-forged steel connecting rods and high compression cast aluminum pistons with full floating pins. A 4-barrel carburetor was mated to a high-rise, dual plane intake manifold feeding high-flow cylinder heads  Its big ports used  intake and  exhaust valves. An aggressive cam was fitted to take advantage of the much better breathing top end. The 1968 4-speed cars got an even hotter cam, but it was discontinued for 1969, where both automatic and manual cars shared the same cam. The engine was equipped with hydraulic lifters and two bolt main bearing caps, leading some to initially underestimate the 340's potential. The 1968-'71 340's compression ratio was 10.5:1, placing it near the limit of what was possible on pump gasoline during that era. The 340 also used additional heavy-duty parts, such as a double-row roller timing chain and sump-mounted windage tray. Power output was officially stated as  gross for the 4 barrel.

In 1970, Chrysler offered a special Six-Pack version of the 340 with triple 2-barrel carburetors rated at  gross that was specific to Challenger TA and Cuda AAR models. This version featured a heavy duty short block with additional webbing to allow for aftermarket installed 4 bolt main bearing caps. The application-specific cylinder heads featured relocated intake pushrod passages with offset rocker arms that allowed the pushrods to be moved away from the intake ports, which could improve airflow if the pushrod-clearance "hump" was ground away from the intake port by the end user. An aluminum intake manifold mounted three Holley carburetors, and a dual points ignition system was fitted.

The combination of rising gasoline prices and insurance company crackdown on high-performance vehicles saw the relatively expensive 340 detuned and phased out. It remained a high performance engine through 1971, but was de-tuned in 1972 with the introduction of low compression (8.5:1) small valve heads, and by mid-year, a cast nodular iron crankshaft, and a variety of other emissions related changes. For the 1974 model year it was replaced by the  engine.

 Chrysler Valiant Charger (Australia)
 Dodge Challenger
 Dodge Charger
 Dodge Dart
 1971–1972 Dodge Demon
 Dodge Super Bee
 Plymouth Barracuda
 Plymouth Duster
 Plymouth Road Runner
 Plymouth Sport Fury GT
 Monica 560
 Hongqi CA770 215 HP

360 V8

It was released in 1971 with a two barrel carburetor. In 1974, with the introduction of the code E58 4-BBl dual exhaust version, at  SAE net, became the most powerful LA engine with the end of 340 production. Power started dropping from 1975 on as more emission controls were added resulting with the 1980 E58 engine only producing  SAE net. Starting with 1981, the 360 was exclusively used in Dodge trucks and vans.

The 1978-1979 Li'l Red Express truck used a special high-performance 360 4-barrel engine with factory production code EH1 that was rated at 225 SAE Net HP in production form The EH1 was a modified version of the E58 360 police engine (E58) producing  net at 3800 rpm due in part, that as it was installed in a "truck", and not a car, it did not have to use catalytic converters (1978 only) which allowed for a free-flowing exhaust system. Some prototypes for the EH1 featured Mopar Performance W2 heads, although the production units had the standard 360 heads. Some police package cars came from the factory with a steel crank and h-beam rods. There was also a "lean burn" version of the 360. The LA360 was replaced in 1993 by the 5.9 Magnum, which shared some design parameters with the LA360, however the majority of its components were different.

Due to additional modifications, the prototype Li'l Red Express truck tested by various period magazines ran appreciably stronger than actual production examples.

 Chrysler 300
 Chrysler Valiant & Valiant Charger (Australia)
 Chrysler by Chrysler (Australia)
 1975–1979 Chrysler Cordoba
 1978–1979 Chrysler LeBaron
 1977–1980 Chrysler New Yorker
 1971–1980 Chrysler Newport
 1976–1980 Dodge Aspen
 1974 Dodge Challenger
 1974–1978 Dodge Charger
 1974–1976 Dodge Coronet
 1974–1976 Dodge Dart
 1978–1979 Dodge Diplomat
 1978–1979 Dodge Magnum
 1971–1978 Dodge Monaco
 1971–1973 Dodge Polara
 1971–1980 Dodge D Series
 1981–1992 Dodge Ram
 1979–1992 Dodge Ram Van/Dodge Ram Wagon
 1971–1992 Dodge Sportsman/Dodge Tradesman
 1974–1992 Dodge Ramcharger
 1974-1981 Plymouth Trail Duster
 1974-1975 Plymouth Road Runner
 1974 Plymouth Barracuda
 1974–1976 Plymouth Duster
 1971–1978 Plymouth Fury
 1975–1977, 1980 Plymouth Gran Fury
 1974–1983 Plymouth Voyager
 1979–1980 Dodge St. Regis
 1976–1980 Plymouth Volare and Dodge B-series vans
 1978–1979 Dodge Lil' Red Express
 (in Bristol-modified form)
 Bristol 603
 Bristol 412
 (in Bristol-modified form with turbocharger)
 Bristol Beaufighter
 Bristol Brigand
 Bristol Beaufort

Interim solutions: the throttle body injected LA engines

The last variation of the LA series to be introduced before the Magnum upgrade was the 1988-92 throttle-body fuel injection, roller cam engine. The first engines to receive these modifications were the  V8 and  V6 engines. A Holley/Chrysler-designed, single-point, twin-injector throttle body assembly that was mounted atop a slightly re-designed cast iron intake manifold. An in-tank electric pump and reservoir replaced the earlier mechanical (camshaft-eccentric driven) pump. The valvetrain was upgraded to include hydraulic roller lifters, however cam specs remained essentially unchanged. The resulting engine was somewhat improved as to power and efficiency. The 5.9 L V8 engines followed suit in 1989, but also received the overall improved "308" cylinder heads (casting number 4448308) that featured significantly higher flowing exhaust ports and a return to the original 1971 (non fast burn) combustion chamber. However, with other manufacturers already introducing the superior multi-point fuel injection system, Chrysler Corporation considered a more drastic upgrade program.

As the TBI engines were being introduced, the new upgrade program was initiated in the Chrysler engineering department. In 1992, with emissions standards becoming ever more stringent in the United States, Chrysler Corporation released the first of the upgraded engines.

Magnum engines
In 1992, Chrysler introduced the first of a series of upgraded versions of the LA engines. The company named their engine the "Magnum", a marketing term that had been used by the company previously to describe both the Dodge Magnum automobile and an earlier Dodge passenger car (only) engine series; the latter was based on the big-block B/RB V8 engines of the 1960s-70s.

The Chrysler Magnum engines are a series of V6, V8, and V10 powerplants used in a number of Chrysler Corporation motor vehicles, as well as in marine and industrial applications. This family of gasoline-burning engines lasted for over a decade, were installed in vehicles sold across the globe, and were produced in the millions.

Technical information

The Magnum engine is a direct descendant of the Chrysler LA engine, which began with the  V8 in 1964. While the Magnum 3.9, Magnum 5.2, and Magnum 5.9 (1992-up) engines were significantly based on the 239, the 318, and the 360 — respectively — many of the parts will not directly interchange and the Magnums are not technically LA engines; the only major parts that are actually unchanged are the connecting rods.

The cylinder block remained basically the same. It was still a V-shaped, 90-degree design made of cast iron. The crankshaft, located to the bottom of the block by five main bearing caps, was cast nodular iron, and the eight connecting rods were forged steel. The pistons were cast aluminum, with a hypereutectic design. Cylinders were numbered from the front of the engine to the rear; cylinders 1, 3, 5 and 7 were found on the left (driver side) bank, or "bank 1", with the even numbers on the other bank.

Coolant passages were located between the cylinders. The gerotor-type oil pump was located at the bottom rear of the engine, and provided oil to both the crankshaft main bearings and the cylinder heads (via the lifters and pushrods, as opposed to a drilled passage on LA engines). Chrysler's engineers also redesigned the oil seals on the crankshaft to improve anti-leak seal performance. The oil pan was also made from thicker steel, and was installed with a more leak-resistant silicone-rubber gasket.

Gasoline was supplied to the intake manifold through a pair of steel rails that fed eight Bosch-type, top-fed, electronically actuated fuel injectors; there was one injector located in each intake runner. Each cylinder had its own injector, thus making the fuel system a "multi-point" type. Fuel pressure was regulated by a vacuum-controlled pressure regulator, located on the return side of the second fuel rail. Excess fuel was thereafter delivered back to the fuel tank. (Later versions had the regulator and filter mounted at the in-tank pump).

To support the new fuel system, the intake manifold was of a new design. Known colloquially as the "beer keg" or "kegger" manifold, the part was shaped like half of a beer barrel lying longitudinally atop the center of the V-shaped engine block. The intake runners, which supplied the fuel and air to each cylinder, fed each of the intake ports in the newly designed cylinder heads. The bolts that secured the intake manifold to the cylinder heads were installed at a different angle from those on the older LA engine; they threaded in vertically, rather than at the 45-degree angle of the 1966-up LA.

Air was provided from the air filter intake to the intake manifold by a Holley-designed, aluminum, twin-venturi, mechanically actuated throttle body, which was bolted atop the intake manifold. Each venturi was progressively bored and had a diameter of 50mm. To this unit were mounted the Throttle Position Sensor (TPS), Manifold Absolute Pressure (MAP) sensor and Idle Air Control (IAC) valve (initially referred to as the "AIS Motor"). A steel cable connected the accelerator pedal inside the vehicle to a mechanical linkage at the side of the throttle body, which acted to open the air intake butterfly valves inside the venturis. During idle these butterfly valves were closed, so a bypass port and the IAC valve were used to control the intake of air.

The cylinder heads were another fundamental change of the Magnum engine, being designed to meet stricter requirements in both power and emissions by increasing efficiency. These heads were cast iron units with new wedge-shaped combustion chambers and high-swirl valve shrouding. Combustion chamber design was most important in these new heads: LA engine cylinder heads were given a full-relief open-chamber design, but the Magnum was engineered with a double-quench closed-chamber type. The higher-flowing intake ports stepped up intake flow dramatically in comparison to the original LA heads, and the exhaust ports improved cylinder evacuation as well. The shape and porting of the chambers allowed for more complete atomization of the air/fuel mixture, as well as contributing to more complete combustion; these virtues allowed for much greater efficiency of the engine as a whole. The intake and exhaust valves were located at the top of each combustion chamber. The valves themselves had shorter, 5/16" diameter stems, to allow for the more aggressive camshaft. Intake valves had a port diameter of 1.92", while exhaust valves were 1.600
", with 60cc combustion chambers. Spark plugs were located at the peak of the combustion chambers' wedge, between the exhaust ports; press-in heat shields protected them from the heat of the exhaust manifolds.

Cast iron exhaust manifolds, less restrictive than units found on previous engines, were bolted to the outboard side of each head. The new cylinder heads also featured stud-mounted rocker arms, a change from the shaft-mounted LA arms. This last change was due to the different oiling system of the new engine, as described in the next paragraph. The valve covers on the Magnum have 10 bolts rather than the previous 5, for improved oil sealing. In addition, the valve covers were made of thicker steel than earlier parts, and were installed with a silicone gasket.

The valvetrain was also updated, although it was still based on a single, center-block-located camshaft pushing on hydraulic lifters and pushrods, one for each rocker arm. However, the cast nodular iron camshaft was of the "roller" type, with each lobe acting upon a hydraulic lifter with a roller bearing on the bottom; this made for a quieter, cooler-running valvetrain, but also allowed for a more aggressive valve lift. Each of the lifters acted upon a steel pushrod, which were of the "oil-through" type. This was another change for the Magnum. Because the new pushrods also served to provide oil to the top of the cylinder head, the rockers were changed to the AMC-style, screw-mounted, bridged half-shaft type. The new rockers also had a higher ratio: 1.6:1 compared to 1.5:1 in the LA engine, which increased leverage on the valves. In addition, the oil boss located at the end of the cylinder head on the LA engine was left undrilled, as it was no longer needed. However, the boss itself was left in place, perhaps to cut down on casting and machining costs, and to allow the use of earlier LA heads.

Engine timing was controlled by the all-steel, silent Morse timing chain (some early production engines had double-row roller timing sets), which was located beneath the aluminum timing cover at the front of the engine block. The timing chain sprockets, one each for the camshaft and crankshaft, were all-steel; for the last few years the LA engine came with nylon teeth on the sprockets. At the rear of the camshaft was cut a set of helical gear teeth, these being used to spin the distributor. Mounted to the front of the timing cover was a new-design counter-clockwise-rotation water pump, with much improved flow. Externally, the accessory drive belt was changed to a serpentine system; coupled with an automatic belt tensioner this increased belt life, reduced maintenance and contributed to lower noise and vibration levels.

The ignition system was also all-new for the Magnum. Controlled by a new micro-processor-equipped Single-Board Engine Controller (SBEC, also known as the ECM, or Engine Control Module), the ignition system included a distributor mounted at the rear of the engine. A 36,000-volt ignition coil, usually located at the front right of the engine, provided electrical power to the center of the distributor cap, where a spinning rotor directed the power to each of the individual cylinders' spark plug wires. Ignition dwell, advance and retardation were electronically controlled by the SBEC.

The SBEC controlled the ignition, as well as the opening and closing of the fuel injectors. During cold startup, wide-open throttle and deceleration, it did this based on "open-loop", pre-programmed operating parameters. During normal idle and cruising, it began "closed-loop" operation, during which the module acted based upon inputs from a variety of sensors. The basic sensors that provided input to the SBEC included the Oxygen sensor (O2), Manifold Absolute Pressure (MAP) sensor, Throttle Position Sensor (TPS), Intake Air Temperature (IAT) sensor and Coolant Temperature sensor (CTS). The basic actuators controlled by the SBEC's outputs included the fuel injectors, ignition coil and pickup, and the Idle Air Control (IAC) valve. The latter controlled idle characteristics. However, the SBEC also controlled the operation of the charging system, air conditioning system, cruise control and, in some vehicles, transmission shifting. By centralizing control of these systems, the operation of the vehicle was simplified and streamlined.

Emissions output was controlled by several systems. The EGR, or Exhaust Gas Recirculation system, brought exhaust gas from the exhaust stream up to the intake manifold, lowering peak combustion temperatures, the goal being the reduction of NOX emissions. A PCV, or Positive Crankcase Ventilation system, introduced oil vapor and unburnt fuel vapors from the crankcase to the intake, allowing the engine to re-use these as well. Furthermore, gasoline vapors that would normally be released into the atmosphere were captured by the EVAP system, to then be introduced into the engine.

In 1996, the OBD-II on-board diagnostics system was introduced on all passenger vehicles in the United States, as per United States Environmental Protection Agency (EPA) regulation. As such, a new engine control computer was developed for vehicles powered by Magnum engines, known as the JTEC. The new Powertrain Control Module was more complex and more intelligent, and added programming meant it could also control automatic transmission and other powertrain functions; its firmware could also be reprogrammed ("reflashed") via the same OBD-II port. With the introduction of the JTEC, the EGR system was dropped from Magnum engines.

Magnum 3.9 L V6

As the 5.2 L V8 was introduced in 1992, the often-forgotten V6 version of the Magnum engine became available in the Ram pickup and the more compact Dodge Dakota. Based on the LA-series  V6, the 3.9 L featured the same changes and upgrades as the other Magnum engines. The 3.9 L can be better understood by imagining a 5.2 L V8 with two cylinders removed.

Firing order was 1-6-5-4-3-2. This engine was last produced for the 2003 Dodge Dakota pickup. Starting in the 2004 model year it was entirely withdrawn from production and replaced with the 3.7 L PowerTech V6 engine.

Applications:
 1992–2003 Dodge Dakota
 1992–2003 Dodge Ram Van/Dodge Ram Wagon
 1992–2001 Dodge Ram

Magnum 5.2 L V8

The Magnum 5.2 L, released in 1992, was an evolutionary development of the  'LA' engine with the same displacement. The 5.2 L was the first of the Magnum upgraded engines, followed in 1993 by the 5.9 L V8 and the 3.9 L V6.

Production of this engine lasted until 2002, when it was completely replaced by the newer 4.7 L PowerTech SOHC V8 engine.

General characteristics:

Engine Type: 90° V-8 OHV 2 valves per cylinder
Bore & Stroke: 
Displacement: 
Firing Order: 1-8-4-3-6-5-7-2
Compression Ratio: 9.1:1 due to 62cc combustion chambers of Magnum heads
Lubrication: Pressure Feed - Full Flow Filtration
Engine Oil Capacity:  with Filter
Cooling System: Liquid - Forced Circulation - Ethylene Glycol Mixture

 1992–2000 Dodge Dakota
 1992–2001 Dodge Ram
 1998–2000 Dodge Durango
 1992–1993 Dodge Ramcharger
 1992–2002 Dodge Ram Van
 1993–1998 Jeep Grand Cherokee

5.9 L Magnum V8

In 1993, Chrysler Corporation released the next member of the Magnum family: the 5.9 L V8. The 5.9 L came factory-installed in 1998-2001 Dodge Dakota R/T pickups and 2000-2003 Dodge Durango R/T SUVs. It was also installed in the Jeep Grand Cherokee Limited 5.9, only available in 1998. The 5.9 L Magnum was available until the 2003 model year, when it was replaced with the 5.7 L Hemi V8 engine.

 1998–2003 Dodge Dakota
 1992–2002 (and early 2003 models) Dodge Ram
 1992–2003 Dodge Ram Van/Dodge Ram Wagon
 1998–2003 Dodge Durango
 1992–2001 Dodge Ramcharger
 1998 Jeep Grand Cherokee 5.9 Limited

8.0 L Magnum V10

As the design for the 5.2 L Magnum V8 was coming together in 1988, consideration was given to the design of a larger V10 iteration, mainly intended for use in Dodge Ram 2500 and 3500 pickups. This was to be Chrysler's first 10-cylinder engine (before the '92 Viper, see below), and can best be understood as a 5.9 L V8 with two cylinders added. Valve covers were die cast magnesium (AZ91D alloy), rather than stamped steel; this lowered noise levels and made for better gasket sealing.

The 8.0 L Magnum V10 first became available in the 1994 model year Dodge Ram 2500 and 3500 pickups, and it was the most powerful gasoline-burning engine then available in any passenger pickup truck. The engine lasted through the 2003 model year, after which it was discontinued.

Applications:
 1994-2003 Dodge Ram 2500/3500 Pickup

Magnums today

Chrysler offers a line of crate engines based on the Magnum designed to bolt into older muscle cars and street rods with little modification. Some of the changes to facilitate this were using a 1970-93 water pump so that older pulleys and brackets could be used, as well as an intake manifold that uses a carburetor instead of electronic fuel injection. Later models equipped with "R/T" or aluminum cylinder heads produced . A  bolt-in fuel injection conversion kit is also available.

Identifying a Magnum engine
The easiest way to differentiate a bare Magnum block from a LA is by checking for the presence of the two crankshaft position sensor mounting bosses on the right rear top of the block, just to the rear of the cylinder head deck surface. Bosses = Magnum.  Keeping in mind that the earlier TBI engines also have crank sensors in this position.

All Magnum engines were stamped with a unique engine ID number. This was located on a flat impression on the cylinder block's right side, near the oil pan gasket surface. From 1992 to 1998, the ID was 19 digits long. An example would be:
4M5.2LT042312345678
-The "4" is the last digit of the model year of the engine. This example is a 1994.
-The "M" stands for "Mound Road", the plant where the engine was assembled. Other characters found here would be "S" for Saltillo, "T" for Trenton and "K" for Toluca.
-5.2L has an obvious meaning here: the displacement of the engine in liters.
-The seventh character, here a "T", was the usage of the engine. "T" translates to truck usage.
-0423 would mean the engine was produced on April 23.
-The final eight digits, here shown as "12345678" are the serial number of the engine.

From 1998 to 2003, the engine ID was shortened to only 13 characters. It differed in that engine displacement was given in cubic inches rather than in liters, the usage character was dropped and the serial number was four instead of eight digits long.

To add some confusion, not only was the name Magnum used on Dodge passcar hi-po engines 1967-1970s, and vehicle lines in the late 1970s and 2000s, it was also applied 4.7L power tech v8 (1999+) and to the 5.7L "Hemi" V8 in pickup trucks (2003+).

See also

 Viper engine
 Chrysler engines
 Chrysler A engine
 Chrysler Hemi engine

References

LA
V6 engines
V8 engines
V10 engines
Gasoline engines by model